Kim Yoon-sik (born 29 January 1984) is a South Korea footballer.

Kim previously played for Pohang Steelers in the K-League, S-League side Super Reds FC and Daejeon KHNP in the Korea National League.

External links 

1984 births
Living people
South Korean footballers
South Korean expatriate footballers
Pohang Steelers players
K League 1 players
Singapore Premier League players
Korea National League players
Expatriate footballers in Singapore
South Korean expatriate sportspeople in Singapore
Association football forwards